The Faculty of Computing and Engineering is one of six educational and research faculties of Ulster University. The faculty is made up of four schools and three research institutes. The faculty is spread across the Ulster University at Belfast, Coleraine and Magee campus' of the University. The Faculty represents the university as a member of the Engineering Professors' Council (EPC), which is the representative body for Engineering in UK higher education.

Schools

School of Computing and Information Engineering
The Ulster University School of Computing and Information Engineering (shortened to SCIE) is physically located at the Coleraine campus of Ulster University, in Coleraine, County Londonderry, Northern Ireland.

School of Computing and Intelligent Systems

The Ulster University School of Computing and Intelligent Systems (shortened to SCIS) is physically located at Magee College of the Ulster University, in Derry, County Londonderry, Northern Ireland. SCIS focuses on teaching and research in the main areas of computer science, games, electronics, robotics and multimedia. It currently offers five main undergraduate bachelor's degree programmes in the above areas and three one-year taught postgraduate master's degrees in the areas of creative technologies, intelligent systems and financial services. PhD research opportunities are also available through the research graduate school.

History
SCIS was formed in 2001 through a merger of the School of Computing and Mathematics and School of Engineering on the Magee campus. Professor Martin McGinnity was the first Head of School (HOS) (2001-2005) and he has since moved on to become Director of the Intelligent Systems Research Centre. Professor Liam Maguire is the current HOS (2005 to date). His inaugural professorial lecture took place in March 2009 to an invited audience.

Notable Activities
Students past and present have been taking part in competitions and events organised by leading software companies and industry.
In 2009, students on the games course were participants in an international video games competition, taking part in the 'Dare to be Digital' competition in Edinburgh.
Microsoft Corporation has also collaborated with SCIS in the hosting of the Games Summit, entitled XNAFEST 2009.
In 2008, top computing students were rewarded for their academic achievements in an awards ceremony which saw students receiving prizes from some of the top IT companies in Northern Ireland.

School of Computing and Mathematics
The Ulster University School of Computing and Mathematics (shortened to SCM) is physically located at the Jordanstown campus of Ulster University, in Newtownabbey, County Antrim, Northern Ireland.

School of Engineering
The Ulster University School of Engineering (shortened to SCE) is physically located at the Jordanstown campus in Newtownabbey, County Antrim, Northern Ireland and at the Magee campus of Ulster University in Derry, County Londonderry, Northern Ireland.

Research Institutes
Research in the School of Computing and Intelligent Systems (SCIS) is carried out by the Intelligent Systems Research Centre (ISRC) undertaken by academic staff. ISRC was officially launched in May 2007 by the then Economy Minister Nigel Dodds  This research is in the areas of computational intelligence, neural networks, fuzzy systems, artificial intelligence, cognitive robotics, ambient intelligence, wireless sensor networks and brain computer interfacing
ISRC was opened in 2006 with £20 million invested by Invest Northern Ireland, ILEX and Ulster University. This is the largest single research investment in the 150-year history of the Magee campus.

References

External links
School of Computing and Intelligent Systems website
Intelligent Systems Research Centre website

Computer science departments in the United Kingdom
Educational institutions established in 2001
Engineering universities and colleges in the United Kingdom
2001 establishments in Northern Ireland
Computing and Intelligent Systems